The 1998 Acura Classic was a women's tennis tournament played on outdoor hard courts at the Manhattan Country Club in Manhattan Beach, California in the United States that was part of Tier II of the 1998 WTA Tour. The tournament was held from August 10 through August 16, 1998.

Finals

Singles

 Lindsay Davenport defeated  Martina Hingis 4–6, 6–4, 6–3
 It was Davenport's 8th title of the year and the 39th of her career.

Doubles

 Martina Hingis /  Natasha Zvereva defeated  Tamarine Tanasugarn /  Elena Tatarkova 6–4, 6–2
 It was Hingis' 11th title of the year and the 36th of her career. It was Zvereva's 5th title of the year and the 78th of her career.

External links
 ITF tournament edition details
 Tournament draws

Acura Classic
LA Women's Tennis Championships
Sports competitions in Manhattan Beach, California
1998 in American tennis
1998 in sports in California